Lipo-oxytocin-1 (LOT-1) is a synthetic peptide and derivative of oxytocin that acts as an agonist of the oxytocin receptor. The lipidation strategy was applied to oxytocin to create a new peptide with improved pharmacokinetics. LOT-1 consists of oxytocin conjugated with two palmitoyl groups. After adjusting for molecular weight (LOT-1 is ~1.5x the weight of oxytocin), oxytocin and LOT-1 are equipotent. In addition, LOT-1 appears to have a significantly longer duration of effect relative to that of oxytocin. It has yet to be determined whether LOT-1 possesses improved blood-brain-barrier permeability relative to oxytocin.

See also
 Carbetocin
 Demoxytocin
 Merotocin
 Palmitoylation

References

Oxytocin receptor agonists
Peptides